Stanley Eric Stubbs is a baseball coach and former catcher and outfielder. He played college baseball at Northeast Mississippi Community College before transferring to Lane where he played from 1993 to 1994. He served as the head coach of the Mississippi Valley State Delta Devils (2022)

Playing career
Stubbs attended  High School, in Booneville, Mississippi and played college baseball at Northeast Mississippi Community College. He then transferred to Lane College where he caught and played outfield for the Dragons.

Coaching career
In 1995, Stubbs began his coaching career as an assistant at Jackson State.

In the summer of 2015, Stubbs was named the head baseball coach of the Texas College Steers. Following two seasons at Texas College, Stubbs was named the head coach of the Rust College

On July 27, 2021, Stubbs was named the head coach of the Mississippi Valley State Delta Devils. The Delta Devils went 10–31–1 in 2022, the 10 wins during the season, were more than the team had won the previous 3 seasons combined. Stubbs resigned on June 15, 2022, due to health concerns.

Head coaching record

References

External links
Mississippi Valley State Delta Devils bio

1972 births
Living people
Baseball players from Mississippi
Albany State Golden Rams baseball coaches
Benedict Tigers baseball coaches
Lane Dragons baseball players
LeMoyne–Owen Magicians baseball coaches
Miami Marlins scouts
Mississippi Valley State Delta Devils baseball coaches
Northeast Mississippi Tigers baseball players
Paine Lions baseball coaches
Rust Bearcats baseball coaches
Savannah State Tigers baseball coaches
Texas College Steers baseball coaches
Washington Nationals scouts